Gilwern Hill is a hill about 3 mi / 5 km southeast of Llandrindod Wells in the county of Powys, Wales.

Geology
The hill is composed from a range of lower and middle Ordovician volcaniclastic rocks which form a part of the Builth Inlier. Palaeontologists Pete Lawrance and Brian Beveridge have spent 30 years examining fossils from a privately owned limestone quarry on the hill. Amongst fossils so far identified at this location are the trilobites Meadowtownella, Bettonolithus, Protolloydolithus and Anebolithus together with Conulariida, Iocrinus, Clonograptus and starfish

Stone rows
There are two prehistoric stone rows at the southern end of the hill, each with a large stone, more than 2m high, at one end.

References

Paleontological sites of Europe
Prehistoric sites in Wales
Mountains and hills of Powys